Sacred Heart Church is a Roman Catholic church in Georgetown, Connecticut, part of the Diocese of Bridgeport. It is listed as a significant contributing property in the Georgetown Historic District. The citation mentions the building's carpenter gothic architecture, points out its valuable stained glass windows, and indicates that the building is especially worthy of being included in this district.

References

External links
 Sacred Heart – website
 Diocese of Bridgeport

Roman Catholic churches in Connecticut
Churches in Fairfield County, Connecticut
Roman Catholic Diocese of Bridgeport
Buildings and structures in Georgetown, Connecticut